Frederick Charles of Schleswig-Holstein-Sonderburg-Plön (August 4, 1706, Sønderborg – the night of October 18–19, 1761, Traventhal), known as Friedrich Karl or Friedrik Carl of Holstein-Plön, was a member of a cadet branch of the Danish royal family and the last duke of the Duchy of Schleswig-Holstein-Sonderburg-Plön (or Holstein-Plön), a Danish royal prince, and a knight of the Order of the Elephant.  When he died without a male heir born of his marriage to Countess Christine Armgard von Reventlow, rule of the Duchy of Holstein-Plön returned to the Danish crown.

Early life
Frederick Charles was born on August 4, 1706, at Sønderborg castle, the posthumous and only son of Christian Charles (1674-1706), a brother of Duke Joachim Frederick of Schleswig-Holstein-Sonderburg-Plön. That duke died in 1722 without closer male heirs than his nephew, who in time succeeded his uncle as partitioned-off duke of Schleswig-Holstein-Sonderburg-Plön.

Frederick Charles's accession was delayed until 1729 because his father had contracted a morganatic marriage with his mother, Dorothea Christina von Aichelberg, who was recognised as a Danish princess by the King only years after her husband's death.

The Baroque ruler

Plön enjoyed a vibrant cultural life under Frederick Charles's rule and artistic patronage. The duke designed, built, and rebuilt residences and gardens in the baroque and rococo styles, some of which still stand (the ducal Plön Castle and the so-called "Princes' House" in Plön among them). Others no longer exist (of particular note is the ducal summer residence in Traventhal, demolished in the nineteenth century).

As no son born of Frederick Charles's marriage survived, in 1756 he concluded a family pact with Frederick V of Denmark, naming the king his successor to the duchy of Plön. The provisions were reified just five years later, when Frederick Charles died, at his little palace in Traventhal, in the night of October 18–19, 1761.

Family

Frederick Charles had six children from his marriage with Countess Christine Armgard von Reventlow (1711-1779), a daughter of the Danish general Christian Detlev, Count von Reventlow, and niece of the Danish queen consort Anne Sophie von Reventlow, who, as his mother, had been born into a non-dynastic noble family:

 Princess Sophia Christine Luise of Schleswig-Holstein-Sonderburg-Plön (November 5, 1732, Plön – March 18, 1757, Quedlinburg), a canoness of Quedlinburg Abbey.
 Princess Fredericka Sophie Charlotte of Schleswig-Holstein-Sonderburg-Plön (November 18, 1736, Plön – January 4, 1769, Schönberg), who married Georg Ludwig II of Erbach-Schönberg.
 Prince Christian Charles of Schleswig-Holstein-Sonderburg-Plön (November 2, 1738, Plön – February 27, 1740, Plön), who died in infancy.
 Stillborn child (March 1741, Plön).
 Princess Charlotte Amalie Wilhelmine of Schleswig-Holstein-Sonderburg-Plön (April 23, 1744, Plön – October 11, 1770, Augustenburg), who married Frederick Christian I of Schleswig-Holstein-Sonderburg-Augustenburg and who became a great-great-grandmother of the last German empress.
 Princess Louise Albertine of Schleswig-Holstein-Sonderburg-Plön (July 21, 1748, Plön – March 2, 1770, Ballenstedt), who married Frederick Albert of Anhalt-Bernburg.

Additionally, Frederick Charles had children by two mistresses:  by Sophie Agnes Olearius, with whom he conducted a six-year liaison, six daughters; and by his maîtresse-en-titre, Maria Catharina Bein, sister of the court chamberlain, three sons (two of whom died childless) and two daughters (one of whom died in childhood), all of whom the duke recognized and legitimated, and on whom (or their mothers) he bestowed lands, titles, and money.

Ancestry

References and notes

Bibliography
 This article parallels one in the German Wikipedia, in which sources are cited.

Additional sources include:
  Carsten Porskrog Rasmussen, Elke Imberger, Dieter Lohmeier, & Ingwer Momsen, Die Fürsten des Landes:  Herzöge und Grafen von Schleswig, Holstein und Lauenburg; Neumünster, Germany:  Wachholtz Verlag, 2008.
  Traugott Schulze & Gerd Stolz, Die Herzogszeit in Plön, 1564-1761; Husum, Germany:  Husum Verlag, 1983.
  Dirck W. Storm, The Holstein Steinholzes:  Their Origin and Descent; privately published monograph [2008].
  William Addams Reitwiesner, "The Ancestry of Duke Frederick of Schleswig-Holstein (1829-1880)" (<http://wargs.com/royal/danneskjold.html>, accessed August 9, 2018).

Websites 
 Family line of Schleswig-Holstein-Plön
 Plön Castle at www.geschichte-s-h.de

Dukes of Schleswig-Holstein-Sonderburg-Norburg
Dukes of Schleswig-Holstein-Sonderburg-Plön
Danish princes
Ordre de l'Union Parfaite
Noble Knights of the Order of the Dannebrog
1706 births
1761 deaths